The 1914 United States Senate election in Kansas was held on November 3, 1914. This was the first election held after the passage of the 17th Amendment, which requires all United States Senators to be elected by popular vote.

Republican primary

Candidates 
 Charles Curtis, former senator
 Joseph Little Bristow, incumbent Senator
 Henry H. Tucker, Jr., oil businessman
 A.M. Harvey, attorney, former lieutenant governor, and veteran of the Spanish–American War

Results

Democratic Party 
 George A. Neeley, U.S. Representative from Kansas's 7th congressional district

Progressive Party 
 Victor Murdock, U.S. Representative from Kansas's 8th congressional district

Results

See also 
 United States Senate elections, 1914

References 

Kansas
1914
1914 Kansas elections